"Na Takú" band (Kapela "Na Taku") (Belarusian: Капэля "На таку́") – Belarusian band, which plays traditional music.

History 
In 2008 singer and piper Źmicier Sidarovič started a band, which organised traditional dancing parties in café "Žar-Ptuška" ("Firebird"),  Minsk, until 2011 and then in other places. After Sidarovič passed away, the band continues to exist. It tours neighbouring Eastern European countries: Latvia, Lithuania, Poland and Ukraine.

Name 
"Na taku" literally means "On the threshing floor" in Belarusian and refers to the folk tradition to arrange dance parties on the vacant threshing floor (cf. "barn dance").

Repertoire 
The band plays old everyday dances which originate both from villages and towns. While the majority of dances are of Belarusian origin, the band plays Lithuanian, Latvian, Estonian, Ukrainian, Polish, Finnish, Austrian, Breton and French dances as well. On the whole more than 100 different dances. Dances are included in the band's repertoire only if they are historically adopted to the rural culture and are well-integrated in tradition.

Members of the band participate in ethnographic expeditions, adopt the traditional manner of playing from authentic musicians.

Members 
 Alaksiej Krukoŭski: accordion
 Taciana Hrynievič-Matafonava: violin
 Raman Jaraš: percussion, harmonica
 Jaŭhien Baryšnikaŭ: percussion, bagpipe
 Darja Zujeva: violin

Past members
 Źmicier Sidarovič: bagpipe
 Ihar Doŭhi: percussion
 Alaksiej "Lesavik": bagpipe, violin

References

Belarusian folk music groups